Rafael Alves dos Santos, or simply Rafael Santos (born 10 November 1984 in Jaboticabal), is a Brazilian central defender.

Career 
On 4 August 2009 Bologna F.C. 1909 signed the Brazilian defender from Atlético Paranaense on loan for one season.

In June 2012 Santos signed a two-year contract, with the possibility of a third, with Arsenal Kyiv in the Ukrainian Premier League. He left Arsenal Kyiv in November 2013 when his contract was cancelled after the club was declared bankrupt. In December 2013 he agreed to a two-year contract with Gabala. On 6 January 2014 Santos completed his move to Gabala. On 20 December 2015, he extended his Gabala contract until 2017. He left Gabala in May 2017 after the expiration of his contract.

Career statistics

Club

Honours
Vitória
Campeonato Baiano (1): 2008
Atlético Paranaense
Campeonato Paranaense (1): 2009

References

External links
 
 CBF 
 Rafael Santos at Futpedia.Globo.com

1984 births
Living people
People from Jaboticabal
Brazilian footballers
Associação Atlética Ponte Preta players
Campeonato Brasileiro Série A players
Serie A players
Ukrainian Premier League players
Azerbaijan Premier League players
Sport Club Internacional players
Club Athletico Paranaense players
Esporte Clube Vitória players
Bologna F.C. 1909 players
FC Arsenal Kyiv players
Gabala FC players
Brazilian expatriate footballers
Expatriate footballers in Italy
Expatriate footballers in Ukraine
Brazilian expatriate sportspeople in Ukraine
Expatriate footballers in Azerbaijan
Association football defenders
Footballers from São Paulo (state)